The University of Colorado (CU) is a system of public universities in Colorado. It consists of four institutions: University of Colorado Boulder, University of Colorado Colorado Springs, University of Colorado Denver, and the University of Colorado Anschutz Medical Campus. It is governed by the elected, nine-member board of regents.

Campuses
 The University of Colorado Boulder (CU Boulder) is the flagship university of the University of Colorado System in Boulder, Colorado. Founded in 1876, the university has more than 37,000 undergraduate and graduate students. It offers more than 2,500 courses in more than 150 areas of study through its nine colleges and schools.
 The University of Colorado Colorado Springs (UCCS) is the fastest growing of the three campuses with an undergraduate and graduate student population of about 12,000 students. It offers 45 bachelor's, 22 master's, and five doctoral degree programs through its six colleges. The campus is located in central Colorado Springs, about 8 miles north of downtown, and 10 miles south of the United States Air Force Academy.
 The University of Colorado Denver (CU Denver) is the largest research university in Colorado, attracting more than $420 million in research annually, and granting more master's degrees than any other institution in Colorado. The campus provides an urban learning center with liberal arts and sciences and professional programs in eight schools and colleges, serving roughly 24,000 students. CU Denver is located in downtown Denver on the Auraria Campus, which is also home to Metropolitan State University of Denver and Community College of Denver.
 The University of Colorado Anschutz Medical Campus (CU Anschutz) in Aurora is home to six professional schools in the health sciences and extensive research and clinical care facilities, including the University of Colorado Hospital, Children's Hospital Colorado and the Anschutz Health and Wellness Center. CU Anschutz has more than 4,300 students, and is the largest academic health center in the Rocky Mountain region of the United States.

Defunct campuses
 The University of Colorado South Denver (CU South Denver), located in Lone Tree, opened in 2015 as a satellite campus of CU Denver, but permanently closed in August 2021 due to the COVID-19 pandemic and concerns surrounding the campus' financial viability. At the time of its closing, the campus offered four academic programs and served nearly 300 students.

Related institutions
 The University of Colorado Hospital Authority (UC Health) was created in 1991 to allow the Regents to reorganize the University of Colorado Hospital.

See also
Sommers–Bausch Observatory

References

External links

 Official website

 
Colorado

Public universities and colleges in Colorado